Edward Dewey may refer to:

Edward R. Dewey (1895–1978), economist
Edward H. Dewey (1837–1904), doctor and pioneer of therapeutic fasting